Margaret Higgins Sanger (born Margaret Louise Higgins; September 14, 1879September 6, 1966), also known as Margaret Sanger Slee, was an American birth control activist, sex educator, writer, and nurse. Sanger popularized the term "birth control", opened the first birth control clinic in the United States, and established organizations that evolved into the Planned Parenthood Federation of America.

Sanger used her writings and speeches primarily to promote her way of thinking. She was prosecuted for her book Family Limitation under the Comstock Act in 1914. She feared the consequences of her writings, so she fled to Britain until public opinion had quieted. Sanger's efforts contributed to several judicial cases that helped legalize contraception in the United States. Due to her connection with Planned Parenthood, Sanger is frequently criticized by opponents of abortion. Sanger drew a sharp distinction between birth control and abortion, and was opposed to abortions throughout the bulk of her professional career, declining to participate in them as a nurse. Sanger remains an admired figure in the American reproductive rights movement. She has been criticized for supporting negative eugenics; Sanger opposed eugenics along racial lines and did not believe that poverty was hereditary. However she would appeal to both ideas as a rhetorical tool.

In 1916, Sanger opened the first birth control clinic in the U.S., which led to her arrest for distributing information on contraception, after an undercover policewoman bought a copy of her pamphlet on family planning. Her subsequent trial and appeal generated controversy. Sanger felt that for women to have a more equal footing in society and to lead healthier lives, they needed to be able to determine when to bear children. She also wanted to prevent so-called back-alley abortions, which were common at the time because abortions were illegal in the U.S. She believed that, while abortion may be a viable option in life-threatening situations for the pregnant, it should generally be avoided. She considered contraception the only practical way to avoid them.

In 1921, Sanger founded the American Birth Control League, which later became the Planned Parenthood Federation of America. In New York City, she organized the first birth control clinic to be staffed by all-female doctors, as well as a clinic in Harlem which had an all African-American advisory council, where African-American staff was later added. In 1929, she formed the National Committee on Federal Legislation for Birth Control, which served as the focal point of her lobbying efforts to legalize contraception in the United States. From 1952 to 1959, Sanger served as president of the International Planned Parenthood Federation. She died in 1966 and is widely regarded as a founder of the modern birth control movement.

Life

Early life 

Sanger was born Margaret Louise Higgins in 1879 in Corning, New York, to Irish Catholic parents—a "free-thinking" stonemason father, Michael Hennessey Higgins, and Anne Purcell Higgins. Michael had immigrated to the United States aged fourteen, joining the Army in the Civil War as a drummer aged fifteen. Upon leaving the army, he studied medicine and phrenology but ultimately became a stonecutter, chiseling-out angels, saints, and tombstones. Michael became an atheist and an activist for women's suffrage and free public education.

Anne accompanied her family to Canada during the Great Famine. She married Michael in 1869. In 22 years, Anne Higgins conceived 18 times, birthing 11 alive before dying aged 49. Sanger was the sixth of 11 surviving children, spending her early years in a bustling household.

Supported by her two older sisters, Margaret Higgins attended Claverack College and Hudson River Institute, before enrolling in 1900 at White Plains Hospital as a nurse probationer. In 1902, she married architect William Sanger, giving up her education.  Suffering from consumption (recurring active tubercular), Margaret Sanger was able to bear three children, and the five settled down to a quiet life in Westchester, New York. Margaret would become a member of an Episcopal Church which would later hold her funeral service.

Social activism 

In 1911, after a fire destroyed their home in Hastings-on-Hudson, the Sangers abandoned the suburbs for a new life in New York City. Margaret Sanger worked as a visiting nurse in the slums of the East Side, while her husband worked as an architect and a house painter. The couple became active in local socialist politics. She joined the Women's Committee of the New York Socialist party, took part in the labor actions of the Industrial Workers of the World (including the notable 1912 Lawrence textile strike and the 1913 Paterson silk strike) and became involved with local intellectuals, left-wing artists, socialists and social activists, including John Reed, Upton Sinclair, Mabel Dodge and Emma Goldman.

Sanger's political interests, her emerging feminism and her nursing experience all led her to write two series of columns on sex education which were titled "What Every Mother Should Know" (1911–12) and "What Every Girl Should Know" (1912–13) for the socialist magazine New York Call. By the standards of the day, Sanger's articles were extremely frank in their discussion of sexuality, and many New York Call readers were outraged by them. Other readers, however, praised the series for its candor.  One stated that the series contained "a purer morality than whole libraries full of hypocritical cant about modesty". Both were published in book form in 1916.

During her work among working-class immigrant women, Sanger met women who underwent frequent childbirth, miscarriages and self-induced abortions for lack of information on how to avoid unwanted pregnancy. Access to contraceptive information was prohibited on grounds of obscenity by the 1873 federal Comstock law and a host of state laws. Seeking to help these women, Sanger visited public libraries, but was unable to find information on contraception. These problems were epitomized in a story that Sanger would later recount in her speeches: while Sanger was working as a nurse, she was called to the apartment of a woman, "Sadie Sachs", who had become extremely ill due to a self-induced abortion. Afterward, Sadie begged the attending doctor to tell her how she could prevent this from happening again, to which the doctor simply advised her to remain abstinent. His exact words and actions, apparently, were to laugh and say "You want your cake while you eat it too, do you? Well it can't be done. I'll tell you the only sure thing to do .... Tell Jake to sleep on the roof." A few months later, Sanger was called back to Sadie's apartment—only this time, Sadie died shortly after Sanger arrived. She had attempted yet another self-induced abortion. Sanger would sometimes end the story by saying, "I threw my nursing bag in the corner and announced ... that I would never take another case until I had made it possible for working women in America to have the knowledge to control birth"; biographer  concluded that Sachs may have been "an imaginative, dramatic composite".

This story—along with Sanger's 1904 rescue of her unwanted niece Olive Byrne from the snowbank in which she had been left—marks the beginning of Sanger's commitment to spare women from the pursuit of dangerous and illegal abortions. Sanger opposed abortion, but primarily as a societal ill and public health danger which would disappear if women were able to prevent unwanted pregnancy.

Given the connection between contraception and working-class empowerment, Sanger came to believe that only by liberating women from the risk of unwanted pregnancy would fundamental social change take place. She launched a campaign to challenge governmental censorship of contraceptive information through confrontational actions.

Sanger became estranged from her husband in 1913, and the couple's divorce was finalized in 1921. In 1922, she married her second husband, James Noah H. Slee. 

In 1914, Sanger launched The Woman Rebel, an eight-page monthly newsletter which promoted contraception using the slogan "No Gods, No Masters". Sanger, collaborating with anarchist friends, popularized the term "birth control" as a more candid alternative to euphemisms such as "family limitation"; the term "birth control" was suggested in 1914 by a young friend called Otto Bobstei Sanger proclaimed that each woman should be "the absolute mistress of her own body." In these early years of Sanger's activism, she viewed birth control as a free-speech issue, and when she started publishing The Woman Rebel, one of her goals was to provoke a legal challenge to the federal anti-obscenity laws which banned dissemination of information about contraception. Though postal authorities suppressed five of its seven issues, Sanger continued publication, all the while preparing Family Limitation, another challenge to anti-birth control laws. This 16-page pamphlet contained detailed and precise information and graphic descriptions of various contraceptive methods. In August 1914, Margaret Sanger was indicted for violating postal obscenity laws by sending The Woman Rebel through the postal system. Rather than stand trial, she fled the country.

Margaret Sanger spent much of her 1914 exile in England, where contact with British neo-Malthusians such as Charles Vickery Drysdale helped refine her socioeconomic justifications for birth control. She shared their concern that over-population led to poverty, famine and war. At the Fifth International Neo-Malthusian Conference in 1922, she was the first woman to chair a session. She organized the Sixth International Neo-Malthusian and Birth-Control Conference that took place in New York in 1925. Over-population would remain a concern of hers for the rest of her life.

During her 1914 trip to England, she was also profoundly influenced by the liberation theories of Havelock Ellis, under whose tutelage she sought not just to make sexual intercourse safer for women but more pleasurable. Around this time she met Marie Stopes, who had run into Sanger after she had just given a talk on birth control at a Fabian Society meeting. Stopes showed Sanger her writings and sought her advice about a chapter on contraception.

Early in 1915, Margaret Sanger's estranged husband, William Sanger, gave a copy of Family Limitation to a representative of anti-vice politician Anthony Comstock. William Sanger was tried and convicted, spending thirty days in jail while attracting interest in birth control as an issue of civil liberty. Margaret's second husband, Noah Slee, also lent his help to her life's work. In 1928, Slee would smuggle diaphragms into New York through Canada in boxes labeled as 3-In-One Oil. He later became the first legal manufacturer of diaphragms in the United States.

Birth control movement 

Some countries in northwestern Europe had more liberal policies towards contraception than the United States at the time, and when Sanger visited a Dutch birth control clinic in 1915, she learned about diaphragms and became convinced that they were a more effective means of contraception than the suppositories and douches that she had been distributing back in the United States. Diaphragms were generally unavailable in the United States, so Sanger and others began importing them from Europe, in defiance of United States law.

On October 16, 1916, Sanger opened a family planning and birth control clinic at 46 Amboy Street in the Brownsville neighborhood of Brooklyn, the first of its kind in the United States. Nine days after the clinic opened, Sanger was arrested. Sanger's bail was set at $500 and she went back home. Sanger continued seeing some women in the clinic until the police came a second time. This time, Sanger and her sister, Ethel Byrne, were arrested for breaking a New York state law that prohibited distribution of contraceptives. Sanger was also charged with running a public nuisance. Sanger and Byrne went to trial in January 1917. Byrne was convicted and sentenced to 30 days in a workhouse but went on a hunger strike. She was force-fed, the first woman hunger striker in the US to be so treated. Only when Sanger pledged that Byrne would never break the law was she pardoned after ten days. Sanger was convicted; the trial judge held that women did not have "the right to copulate with a feeling of security that there will be no resulting conception." Sanger was offered a more lenient sentence if she promised to not break the law again, but she replied: "I cannot respect the law as it exists today." For this, she was sentenced to 30 days in a workhouse. An initial appeal was rejected, but in a subsequent court proceeding in 1918, the birth control movement won a victory when Judge Frederick E. Crane of the New York Court of Appeals issued a ruling which allowed doctors to prescribe contraception. The publicity surrounding Sanger's arrest, trial, and appeal sparked birth control activism across the United States and earned the support of numerous donors, who would provide her with funding and support for future endeavors.

In February 1917, Sanger began publishing the monthly periodical Birth Control Review.

American Birth Control League 

After World War I, Sanger shifted away from radical politics, and she founded the American Birth Control League (ABCL) in 1921 to enlarge her base of supporters to include the middle class. The founding principles of the ABCL were as follows:

After Sanger's appeal of her conviction for the Brownsville clinic secured a 1918 court ruling that exempted physicians from the law prohibiting the distribution of contraceptive information to women (provided it was prescribed for medical reason), she established the Clinical Research Bureau (CRB) in 1923 to exploit this loophole. The CRB was the first legal birth control clinic in the United States, staffed entirely by female doctors and social workers. The clinic received extensive funding from John D. Rockefeller Jr. and his family, who continued to make anonymous donations to Sanger's causes in subsequent decades.

John D. Rockefeller Jr. donated five thousand dollars to her American Birth Control League in 1924 and a second time in 1925.
In 1922, she traveled to China, Korea, and Japan. In China, she observed that the primary method of family planning was female infanticide, and she later worked with Pearl Buck to establish a family planning clinic in Shanghai. Sanger visited Japan six times, working with Japanese feminist Kato Shidzue to promote birth control. 

In 1928, conflict within the birth control movement leadership led Sanger to resign as the president of the ABCL and take full control of the CRB, renaming it the Birth Control Clinical Research Bureau (BCCRB), marking the beginning of a schism that would last until 1938.

Sanger invested a great deal of effort communicating with the general public. From 1916 onward, she frequently lectured (in churches, women's clubs, homes, and theaters) to workers, churchmen, liberals, socialists, scientists, and upper-class women. She once lectured on birth control to the women's auxiliary of the Ku Klux Klan in Silver Lake, New Jersey. In her autobiography, she justified her decision to address them by writing "Always to me any aroused group was a good group," meaning that she was willing to seek common ground with anyone who might help promote legalization and awareness of birth-control. She described the experience as "weird", and reported that she had the impression that the audience were all half-wits, and, therefore, spoke to them in the simplest possible language, as if she were talking to children.

She wrote several books in the 1920s which had a nationwide impact in promoting the cause of birth control. Between 1920 and 1926, 567,000 copies of Woman and the New Race and The Pivot of Civilization were sold. She also wrote two autobiographies designed to promote the cause. The first, My Fight for Birth Control, was published in 1931 and the second, more promotional version, Margaret Sanger: An Autobiography, was published in 1938.

During the 1920s, Sanger received hundreds of thousands of letters, many of them written in desperation by women begging for information on how to prevent unwanted pregnancies. Five hundred of these letters were compiled into the 1928 book, Motherhood in Bondage.

Work with the African-American community 

Sanger worked with African American leaders and professionals who saw a need for birth control in their communities. In 1929, James H. Hubert, a Black social worker and the leader of New York's Urban League, asked Sanger to open a clinic in Harlem. Sanger secured funding from the Julius Rosenwald Fund and opened the clinic, staffed with Black doctors, in 1930. The clinic was directed by a 15-member advisory board consisting of Black doctors, nurses, clergy, journalists, and social workers. The clinic was publicized in the African-American press as well as in Black churches, and it received the approval of W.E.B. Du Bois, the co-founder of the National Association for the Advancement of Colored People (NAACP) and the editor of its magazine,  The Crisis. Sanger did not tolerate bigotry among her staff, nor would she tolerate any refusal to work within interracial projects. Sanger's work with minorities earned praise from Coretta and Martin Luther King Jr.; when he was not able to attend his Margaret Sanger award ceremony, in May 1966, Mrs. King read her husband's acceptance speech that praised Sanger, but first said her own words: "Because of [Sanger's] dedication, her deep convictions, and for her suffering for what she believed in, I would like to say that I am proud to be a woman tonight."

From 1939 to 1942, Sanger was an honorary delegate of the Birth Control Federation of America, which included a supervisory role—alongside Mary Lasker and Clarence Gamble—in the Negro Project, an effort to deliver information about birth control to poor Black people. Sanger advised Dr. Gamble on the utility of hiring a Black physician for the Negro Project. She also advised him on the importance of reaching out to Black ministers, writing:
The ministers work is also important and also he should be trained, perhaps by the [Birth Control] Federation [of America] as to our ideals and the goal that we hope to reach. We do not want word to go out that we want to exterminate the Negro population and the minister is the man who can straighten out that idea if it ever occurs to any of their more rebellious members.

New York University's Margaret Sanger Papers Project says that though the letter would have been meant to avoid the mistaken notion that the Negro Project was a racist campaign, detractors of Sanger, such as Angela Davis, have interpreted the passage "as evidence that she led a calculated effort to reduce the Black population against its will". Others, such as Charles Valenza, state that this notion is based on a misreading of Sanger's words. He believes that Sanger wanted to overcome the fear of some black people that birth control was "the white man's way of reducing the black population".

Planned Parenthood era 

In 1929, Sanger formed the National Committee on Federal Legislation for Birth Control in order to lobby for legislation to overturn restrictions on contraception. That effort failed to achieve success, so Sanger ordered a diaphragm from Japan in 1932, in order to provoke a decisive battle in the courts. The diaphragm was confiscated by the United States government, and Sanger's subsequent legal challenge led to a 1936 court decision which overturned an important provision of the Comstock laws which prohibited physicians from obtaining contraceptives. This court victory motivated the American Medical Association in 1937 to adopt contraception as a normal medical service and a key component of medical school curriculums.

This 1936 contraception court victory was the culmination of Sanger's birth control efforts, and she took the opportunity, now in her late 50s, to move to Tucson, Arizona, intending to play a less critical role in the birth control movement. In spite of her original intentions, she remained active in the movement through the 1950s.

In 1937, Sanger became chairman of the newly formed Birth Control Council of America, and attempted to resolve the schism between the ABCL and the BCCRB. Her efforts were successful, and the two organizations merged in 1939 as the Birth Control Federation of America. Although Sanger continued in the role of president, she no longer wielded the same power as she had in the early years of the movement, and in 1942, more conservative forces within the organization changed the name to Planned Parenthood Federation of America, a name Sanger objected to because she considered it too euphemistic.

In 1948, Sanger helped found the International Committee on Planned Parenthood, which evolved into the International Planned Parenthood Federation in 1952, and soon became the world's largest non-governmental international women's health, family planning and birth control organization. Sanger was the organization's first president and served in that role until she was 80 years old. In the early 1950s, Sanger encouraged philanthropist Katharine McCormick to provide funding for biologist Gregory Pincus to develop the birth control pill which was eventually sold under the name Enovid. Pincus had recruited Dr. John Rock, Harvard gynecologist, to investigate clinical use of progesterone to prevent ovulation.  (Jonathan Eig (2014).  "The Birth of the Pill: How Four Crusaders Reinvented Sex and Launched a Revolution."  W. W. Norton & Company.  New York.  London.  pp. 104ff.)  Pincus would often say that he never could have done it without Sanger, McCormick, and Rock.  (Ibid., p. 312.)

Death 
Sanger died of congestive heart failure in 1966 in Tucson, Arizona, aged 86, about a year after the U.S. Supreme Court's landmark decision in Griswold v. Connecticut, which legalized birth control in the United States. Sanger called herself an Episcopalian by religion and her funeral was held at St. Philip's in the Hills Episcopal Church. Sanger is buried in Fishkill, New York, next to her sister, Nan Higgins, and her second husband, Noah Slee. One of her surviving brothers was College Football Hall of Fame player and Pennsylvania State University Head Football coach Bob Higgins.

Views

Sexuality 
While researching information on contraception, Sanger read treatises on sexuality including The Psychology of Sex by the English psychologist Havelock Ellis and was heavily influenced by it. While traveling in Europe in 1914, Sanger met Ellis. Influenced by Ellis, Sanger adopted his view of sexuality as a powerful, liberating force. This view provided another argument in favor of birth control, because it would enable women to fully enjoy sexual relations without fear of unwanted pregnancy. Sanger also believed that sexuality, along with birth control, should be discussed with more candor, and praised Ellis for his efforts in this direction. She also blamed Christianity for the suppression of such discussions.

Sanger opposed excessive sexual indulgence. She wrote that  "every normal man and woman has the power to control and direct his sexual impulse. Men and women who have it in control and constantly use their brain cells thinking deeply, are never sensual." Sanger said that birth control would elevate women away from the position of being objects of lust and elevate sex away from an activity that was purely being engaged in for the purpose of satisfying lust, saying that birth control "denies that sex should be reduced to the position of sensual lust, or that woman should permit herself to be the instrument of its satisfaction." Sanger wrote that masturbation was dangerous. She stated: "In my personal experience as a trained nurse while attending persons afflicted with various and often revolting diseases, no matter what their ailments, I never found anyone so repulsive as the chronic masturbator. It would not be difficult to fill page upon page of heart-rending confessions made by young girls, whose lives were blighted by this pernicious habit, always begun so innocently." She believed that women had the ability to control their sexual impulses, and should utilize that control to avoid sex outside of relationships marked by "confidence and respect". She believed that exercising such control would lead to the "strongest and most sacred passion". Sanger maintained links with affiliates of the British Society for the Study of Sex Psychology (which contained a number of high-profile gay men and sexual reformers as members), and gave a speech to the group on the issue of sexual continence. She later praised Ellis for clarifying "the question of homosexuals ... making the thing a—not exactly a perverted thing, but a thing that a person is born with different kinds of eyes, different kinds of structures and so forth ... that he didn't make all homosexuals perverts—and I thought he helped clarify that to the medical profession and to the scientists of the world as perhaps one of the first ones to do that.

Freedom of speech 
Sanger opposed censorship throughout her career. Sanger grew up in a home where orator Robert Ingersoll was admired. During the early years of her activism, Sanger viewed birth control primarily as a free-speech issue, rather than as a feminist issue, and when she started publishing The Woman Rebel in 1914, she did so with the express goal of provoking a legal challenge to the Comstock laws banning dissemination of information about contraception. In New York, Emma Goldman introduced Sanger to members of the Free Speech League, such as Edward Bliss Foote and Theodore Schroeder, and subsequently the League provided funding and advice to help Sanger with legal battles.

Over the course of her career, Sanger was arrested at least eight times for expressing her views during an era in which speaking publicly about contraception was illegal. Numerous times in her career, local government officials prevented Sanger from speaking by shuttering a facility or threatening her hosts. In Boston in 1929, city officials under the leadership of James Curley threatened to arrest her if she spoke. In response she stood on stage, silent, with a gag over her mouth, while her speech was read by Arthur M. Schlesinger, Sr.

Eugenics 

After World War I, Sanger increasingly posited a societal need to limit births by those least able to afford children. The affluent and educated already limited their child-bearing, while the poor and uneducated lacked access to contraception and information about birth control. Here she found an area of overlap with eugenicists. She believed that they both sought to "assist the race toward the elimination of the unfit." She distinguished herself from other eugenicists, by writing " imply or insist that a woman's first duty is to the state; we contend that her duty to herself is her duty to the state. We maintain that a woman possessing an adequate knowledge of her reproductive functions is the best judge of the time and conditions under which her child should be brought into the world. We further maintain that it is her right, regardless of all other considerations, to determine whether she shall bear children or not, and how many children she shall bear if she chooses to become a mother." Sanger was a proponent of negative eugenics, which aimed to improve human hereditary traits through social intervention by reducing the reproduction of those who were considered unfit.

Sanger's view of eugenics was influenced by Havelock Ellis and other British eugenicists, including H. G. Wells, with whom she formed a close, lasting friendship. She did not speak specifically to the idea of race or ethnicity being determining factors and "although Sanger articulated birth control in terms of racial betterment and, like most old-stock Americans, supported restricted immigration, she always defined fitness in individual rather than racial terms." Instead, she stressed limiting the number of births to live within one's economic ability to raise and support healthy children. This would lead to a betterment of society and the human race. Sanger's view put her at odds with leading American eugenicists, such as Charles Davenport, who took a racist view of inherited traits. In A History of the Birth Control Movement in America, Engelman also noted that "Sanger quite effortlessly looked the other way when others spouted racist speech. She had no reservations about relying on flawed and overtly racist works to serve her own propaganda needs." Sanger was supported by one of the most racist authors in America in the 1920s, the Klansman Lothrop Stoddard, who was a founding member of the Board of Directors of Sanger's American Birth Control League. Biographer Ellen Chesler commented: "Margaret Sanger was never herself a racist, but she lived in a profoundly bigoted society, and her failure to repudiate prejudice unequivocally—especially when it was manifest among proponents of her cause—has haunted her ever since."

In "The Morality of Birth Control", a 1921 speech, she divided society into three groups: the "educated and informed" class that regulated the size of their families, the "intelligent and responsible" who desired to control their families in spite of lacking the means or the knowledge, and the "irresponsible and reckless people" whose religious scruples "prevent their exercising control over their numbers". Sanger concludes, "There is no doubt in the minds of all thinking people that the procreation of this group should be stopped."

Sanger's eugenics policies included an exclusionary immigration policy, free access to birth control methods, and full family planning autonomy for the able-minded, as well as compulsory segregation or sterilization for the "profoundly retarded". Sanger wrote, "we [do not] believe that the community could or should send to the lethal chamber the defective progeny resulting from irresponsible and unintelligent breeding."  In The Pivot of Civilization she criticized certain charity organizations for providing free obstetric and immediate post-birth care to indigent women without also providing information about birth control nor any assistance in raising or educating the children.  By such charities, she wrote, "The poor woman is taught how to have her seventh child, when what she wants to know is how to avoid bringing into the world her eighth."

In personal correspondence, she expressed her sadness about the aggressive and lethal Nazi eugenics program, and donated to the American Council Against Nazi Propaganda. Sanger believed that self-determining motherhood was the only unshakable foundation for racial betterment. Initially she advocated that the responsibility for birth control should remain with able-minded individual parents rather than the state. Later, she proposed that "Permits for parenthood shall be issued upon application by city, county, or state authorities to married couples," but added that the requirement should be implemented by state advocacy and reward for complying, not enforced by punishing anyone for violating it.

Abortion 

Sanger opposed abortion and sharply distinguished it from birth control. She believed that the latter is a fundamental right of women and the former is a shameful crime. In 1916, when she opened her first birth control clinic, she was employing harsh rhetoric against abortion. Flyers she distributed to women exhorted them in all capitals: "Do not kill, do not take life, but prevent." Sanger's patients at that time were told "that abortion was the wrong way—no matter how early it was performed it was taking life; that contraception was the better way, the safer way—it took a little time, a little trouble, but it was well worth while in the long run, because life had not yet begun."  Sanger consistently distanced herself from any calls for legal access to abortion, arguing that legal access to contraceptives would remove the need for abortion. Ann Hibner Koblitz has argued that Sanger's anti-abortion stance contributed to the further stigmatization of abortion and impeded the growth of the broader reproductive rights movement.

While Sanger condemned abortion as a method of family limitation, she was not opposed to abortion intended to save a woman's life. Furthermore, in 1932, Sanger directed the Clinical Research Bureau to start referring patients to hospitals for therapeutic abortions when indicated by an examining physician. She also advocated for birth control so that the pregnancies that led to therapeutic abortions could be prevented in the first place.

Legacy 

Sanger's writings are curated by two universities: New York University's history department maintains the Margaret Sanger Papers Project, and Smith College's Sophia Smith Collection maintains the Margaret Sanger Papers collection.

Sanger's story also features in several biographies, including David Kennedy's biography Birth Control in America: The Career of Margaret Sanger (1970), which won the Bancroft Prize and the John Gilmary Shea Prize. She is also the subject of the television films Portrait of a Rebel: The Remarkable Mrs. Sanger (1980), and Choices of the Heart: The Margaret Sanger Story (1995). In 2013, the American cartoonist Peter Bagge published Woman Rebel, a full-length graphic-novel biography of Sanger.  In 2016, Sabrina Jones published the graphic novel "Our Lady of Birth Control: A Cartoonist's Encounter With Margaret Sanger."

Sanger has been recognized with several honors. Her speech  "Children's Era", given in 1925, is listed as #81 in American Rhetoric's Top 100 Speeches of the 20th Century (listed by rank). Sanger was an inspiration for Wonder Woman, the comic-book character introduced by William Marston in 1941. Marston was influenced by early feminist thought while in college, and later formed a romantic relationship with Sanger's niece, Olive Byrne. According to Jill Lepore, several Wonder Woman story lines were at least in part inspired by Sanger, like the character's involvement with different labor strikes and protests. Between (and including) 1953 and 1963, Sanger was nominated for the Nobel Peace Prize 31 times. In 1957, the American Humanist Association named her Humanist of the Year. In 1966, Planned Parenthood began issuing its Margaret Sanger Awards annually to honor "individuals of distinction in recognition of excellence and leadership in furthering reproductive health and reproductive rights". The 1979 artwork The Dinner Party features a place setting for her. In 1981, Sanger was inducted into the National Women's Hall of Fame. In 1976, she was inducted into the first class of the Steuben County (NY) Hall of Fame.  In 1993, the United States National Park Service designated the Margaret Sanger Clinic—where she provided birth-control services in New York in the mid-twentieth century—as a National Historic Landmark. As well, government authorities and other institutions have memorialized Sanger by dedicating several landmarks in her name, including a residential building on the Stony Brook University campus, a room in Wellesley College's library, and Margaret Sanger Square in New York City's Noho area. There is a Margaret Sanger Lane in Plattsburgh, New York and an Allée Margaret Sanger in Saint-Nazaire, France. There is a bust of Sanger in the National Portrait Gallery, which was a gift from Cordelia Scaife May. Sanger, a crater in the northern hemisphere of Venus, takes its name from Margaret Sanger.

Due to her connection with Planned Parenthood, many who oppose abortion frequently condemn Sanger by criticizing her views on birth control and eugenics.

In July, 2020, Planned Parenthood of Greater New York announced their intention to rename the Planned Parenthood headquarters on Bleecker Street, which was named after Sanger. This decision was made in response to criticisms over Sanger's promotion of eugenics. In announcing the decision, Karen Seltzer explained, "The removal of Margaret Sanger's name from our building is both a necessary and overdue step to reckon with our legacy and acknowledge Planned Parenthood's contributions to historical reproductive harm within communities of color."

Works

Books and pamphlets 
 What Every Mother Should Know – Originally published in 1911 or 1912, based on a series of articles Sanger published in 1911 in the New York Call, which were, in turn, based on a set of lectures Sanger gave to groups of Socialist party women in 1910–1911. Multiple editions published through the 1920s, by Max N. Maisel and Sincere Publishing, with the title What Every Mother Should Know, or how six little children were taught the truth ... Online (1921 edition, Michigan State University)
 Family Limitation – Originally published 1914 as a 16-page pamphlet; also published in several later editions. Online (1917, 6th edition, Michigan State University); Online (1920 English edition, Bakunin Press, revised by author from 9th American edition);
 What Every Girl Should Know – Originally published 1916 by Max N. Maisel; 91 pages; also published in several later editions. Online (1920 edition); Online (1922 ed., Michigan State University)
 The Case for Birth Control: A Supplementary Brief and Statement of Facts – May 1917, published to provide information to the court in a legal proceeding. Online (Internet Archive)
 Woman and the New Race, 1920, Truth Publishing, foreword by Havelock Ellis. Online  (Harvard University); Online (Project Gutenberg); Online (Internet Archive); Audio on Archive.org
 Debate on Birth Control – 1921, text of a debate between Sanger, Theodore Roosevelt, Winter Russell, George Bernard Shaw, Robert L. Wolf, and Emma Sargent Russell. Published as issue 208 of Little Blue Book series by Haldeman-Julius Co. Online (1921, Michigan State University)
 The Pivot of Civilization, 1922, Brentanos. Online (1922, Project Gutenberg); Online (1922, Google Books)
 Motherhood in Bondage, 1928, Brentanos. Online (Google Books).
 My Fight for Birth Control, 1931, New York: Farrar & Rinehart
 
 Fight for Birth Control, 1916, New York (The Library of Congress)
 "Birth Control: A Parent's Problem or Women's?" The Birth Control Review, Mar. 1919, 6–7.

Periodicals 
 The Woman Rebel – Seven issues published monthly from March 1914 to August 1914. Sanger was publisher and editor. Sample article The Woman Rebel, Vol. 1, No. 4, June 1914, 25, Margaret Sanger Microfilm, C16:0539.
 Birth Control Review – Published monthly from February 1917 to 1940. Sanger was editor until 1929, when she resigned from the ABCL. Not to be confused with Birth Control News, published by the London-based Society for Constructive Birth Control and Racial Progress.

Collections and anthologies 
 Sanger, Margaret, The Selected Papers of Margaret Sanger, Volume 1: The Woman Rebel, 1900–1928, Esther Katz, Cathy Moran Hajo, Peter Engelman (eds.), University of Illinois Press, 2003
 Sanger, Margaret, The Selected Papers of Margaret Sanger, Volume 2: Birth Control Comes of Age, 1928–1939, Esther Katz, Cathy Moran Hajo, Peter Engelman (eds.), University of Illinois Press, 2007
 Sanger, Margaret, The Selected Papers of Margaret Sanger, Volume 3: The Politics of Planned Parenthood, 1939–1966, Esther Katz, Cathy Moran Hajo, Peter Engelman (eds.), University of Illinois Press, 2010
 
 The Margaret Sanger Papers at Smith College
 The Margaret Sanger Papers Project at New York University
 
 Correspondence between Sanger and McCormick, from The Pill  documentary movie; supplementary material, PBS, American Experience (producers).  Online.

Speeches 
 Sanger, Margaret, "The Morality of Birth Control" 1921.
 Sanger, Margaret, "The Children's Era" 1925.
 Sanger, Margaret, "Woman and the Future" 1937.

In popular culture

Graphic novels

See also

Notes

References

Bibliography 

 

 

 

 

 

 

 

 

 
 Coigney, Virginia (1969), Margaret Sanger: Rebel With a Cause, Doubleday

 

 

 

 

 

 

 

 

 
 

 

 

 

 

  Reprinted: 
 Lader, Lawrence and Meltzer, Milton (1969), Margaret Sanger: pioneer of birth control, Crowell

Historiography

External links 

 
 
 
 
 Margaret Sanger Papers at the Sophia Smith Collection, Smith College
 Interview  conducted by Mike Wallace, September 21, 1957. Hosted at the Harry Ransom Center.
 9 Things You Should Know About Margaret Sanger TGC—The Gospel Coalition
 Michals, Debra "Margaret Sanger". National Women's History Museum. 2017.
 Opposition claims about Margaret Sanger. Planned Parenthood. 2021.

1879 births
1966 deaths
American birth control activists
American democratic socialists
American Episcopalians
American eugenicists
American humanists
American nonprofit executives
American nurses
American women nurses
American people of Irish descent
American women's rights activists
Claverack College alumni
Free speech activists
Industrial Workers of the World members
Members of the Socialist Party of America
People from Corning, New York
People from Greenwich Village
People from Hastings-on-Hudson, New York
People associated with Planned Parenthood
Presidents of Planned Parenthood
Sex educators
American socialist feminists
Women nonprofit executives